Carl Albert Hintermann (2 November 1876 –  1945) was a Swiss footballer who played for FC Basel. He played in the position as defender and as midfielder.

Between the years 1893 and 1896 Hintermann played a total of 4 games for Basel without scoring a goal. These games were friendly games. This Swiss domestic league was not founded until 1896.

He was also member of the FC Basel board of directors. He presided the club's board during the 1913–14 season. He took over as chairman following Karl Ibach and preceding Ernst-Alfred Thalmann's fifth presidential period.

Sources and References
 Rotblau: Jahrbuch Saison 2017/2018. Publisher: FC Basel Marketing AG. 
 Die ersten 125 Jahre. Publisher: Josef Zindel im Friedrich Reinhardt Verlag, Basel. 
 Verein "Basler Fussballarchiv" Homepage

FC Basel players
Swiss men's footballers
Association football defenders
Association football midfielders
Swiss football chairmen and investors
1876 births
1945 deaths